John Fredrick Stoddart (22 September 1805  29 August 1839) was a Puisne Justice of the Supreme Court of Ceylon. Stoddart was the son of John Stoddart, Chief Justice of Malta.

References

Citations

Bibliography

 

Puisne Justices of the Supreme Court of Ceylon
British expatriates in Sri Lanka
Sri Lankan people of Maltese descent

19th-century British people
1805 births
1839 deaths